Shaun Peter Wade (born 22 September 1969) is an English former footballer who played in the Football League for Stoke City.

Career
Wade was born in Stoke-on-Trent and began his career with local side Newcastle Town. He was given a chance to play professional football by Stoke City manager Lou Macari quite belatedly at the age of 24. He made just one appearance for Stoke which came as a substitute in a 1–1 at home to Sheffield United in November 1994. A cruciate knee ligament injury ended his chances of a professional career and he returned to Newcastle Town.

Career statistics
Source:

References

English footballers
Stoke City F.C. players
English Football League players
1969 births
Living people
Newcastle Town F.C. players
Association football forwards